Touch El Arab was a pop/electronica group from Basel, Switzerland, formed by members Philippe Alioth, Christoph Müller and Stefan Hopmann. Their humorous song "Muhammar" was a major hit in Switzerland, France and Italy in 1987 and 1988. Christoph Müller is a former member of Boyz from Brazil and is now a member of Gotan Project.

Swiss electronic music groups